Big Bear was a Cree chief who is most notable for the North-West Rebellion.

Big Bear may also refer to:

Characters
 Big Bear (comics), a fictional superhero from the Forever People comics
 Big Bear (G.I. Joe), a fictional soldier from the G.I. Joe character line
 Raiden (Fatal Fury) or Big Bear, fictional wrestler from the Fatal Fury series

Companies and brands
 Big Bear Markets, a defunct supermarket chain in San Diego County, California, U.S.
 Big Bear Stores, a defunct supermarket chain in the midwestern United States
 Big Bear Limited, an English food company
 Big Bear Records, a jazz record label
 Marui Big Bear Datsun, a remote control car made by Marui
 Big Bear (malt liquor), a brand of malt liquor distributed by Pabst Brewing Company

People
 Mecosta, a 19th-century Potawatomi chief also known as Big Bear
 Big Bear (American football) (1889–1959), Native American professional football player
 Owen Benjamin (born 1980), comedian, pianist and actor

Places
 Big Bear Lake, a reservoir in California, United States
 Big Bear Lake, California, a city near the reservoir
 Big Bear City, California, a town near the reservoir
 Big Bear Discovery Center, a facility near the reservoir

Other
 Ursa Major, a constellation
Michigan–Michigan State men's soccer rivalry, American college soccer rivalry which plays for the Big Bear Trophy

See also
 Great Bear (disambiguation)